Maru is a Local Government Area in Zamfara State, Nigeria. Its headquarters are in the town of Maru at   in the far north of the Area.

It has an area of 6,654 km and a population of 291,900 at the 2006 census.
 
The postal code of the area is 890.

Gallery

References

Local Government Areas in Zamfara State